Thin Line may refer to:
 The Thin Line (novel), a 1951 crime novel by Edward Atiyah
 The Thin Line (1966 film), a 1966 film directed by Mikio Naruse
 The Thin Line (1980 film), a 1980 Israeli drama art film directed by Michal Bat-Adam
 The Thin Line (TV series), a 2008 Malaysian drama
 Thin Line (album), a 2016 album by country singer Billy Ray Cyrus
 "Thin Line", a song on Macklemore & Ryan Lewis's 2012 album The Heist
 "Thin Line", a song on Reks' 2011 album Rhythmatic Eternal King Supreme